Jenni Pitko (born 15 August 1986 in Kemi) is a Finnish politician currently serving in the Parliament of Finland for the Green League at the Oulu constituency. She was first elected to parliament in 2019. Previously, she served on the Oulu city council. Prior to becoming a politician Pitko studied at the University of Oulu and worked as an architect.

References

1986 births
Living people
People from Kemi
Green League politicians
Members of the Parliament of Finland (2019–23)
21st-century Finnish women politicians
Women members of the Parliament of Finland
University of Oulu alumni